is a Japanese footballer who plays as a forward for WE League club Urawa Reds and as a defender for the Japan women's national team.

Career statistics

International 

Scores and results list Japan's goal tally first, score column indicates score after each Seike goal.

References

1996 births
Living people
Japanese women's footballers
Women's association football forwards
Women's association football defenders
Urawa Red Diamonds Ladies players
Nadeshiko League players
Japan women's international footballers